Jaylen Samuels (born July 20, 1996) is an American football running back who is currently a free agent. He played college football at North Carolina State University.

Early years
Samuels attended and played high school football at Mallard Creek High School. While there, he played at the safety position.

College career
Throughout his college career at North Carolina State, Samuels changed positions, being listed as a running back, fullback, wide receiver and tight end. He scored a touchdown in the 2014 St. Petersburg Bowl. After his junior season, Samuels was able to participate in the 2016 Independence Bowl against Vanderbilt, where he caught three touchdown passes, the most in Independence Bowl history. Due to his contribution, he was named the MVP of the Independence Bowl.  During his senior season, Samuels set the NC State record for career receptions with 201 during his four years.  After this season, Samuels was invited to the 2018 Senior Bowl. Following his senior season, he was honored as 1st Team All-Conference as an "All-Purpose" player as well as 3rd Team AP All-American as a tight end. He finished his college career with 1,851 receiving yards, 1,107 rushing yards, and 47 total touchdowns.

Collegiate statistics

Professional career

Pittsburgh Steelers
The Pittsburgh Steelers selected Samuels in the fifth round with the 165th overall pick in the 2018 NFL Draft. Samuels was the 14th running back drafted in 2018.

2018
On May 9, 2018, the Pittsburgh Steelers signed Samuels to a four-year, $2.71 million contract that includes a signing bonus of $258,066.

Due to a Week 13 injury to starter James Conner, Samuels earned his first career NFL start in Week 14 against the Oakland Raiders. In the game, Samuels rushed for 28 yards on 11 attempts and caught seven passes for 64 yards in a 24–21 loss. The following week against the New England Patriots, Samuels rushed 19 times for 142 yards and caught two passes for 30 yards in a 17–10 win. His 142 rushing yards marked the second most by a rookie in Steelers history, behind only Bam Morris, who rushed for 146 yards against the New York Giants in 1994.

2019
In Week 4 against the Cincinnati Bengals, Samuels completed three passes for 31 yards, rushed 10 times for 26 yards and a touchdown, and caught eight passes for 57 yards in the 27–3 win. After missing two games due to a knee injury, Samuels returned to action in Week 9 against the Indianapolis Colts. In the game, Samuels rushed eight times for 10 yards and recorded 13 catches for 73 yards in the 26–24 win. Samuels's 13 catches in the game was a franchise record for catches by a running back in a game, surpassing LeVeon Bell's 12 catches in a game in 2017. Overall, Samuels finished the 2019 season with 175 rushing yards and one rushing touchdown to go along with 47 receptions for 305 receiving yards and one receiving touchdown.

2020
Samuels was placed on the reserve/COVID-19 list by the Steelers on August 2, 2020. He was activated from the list on August 13. He was placed on the reserve/COVID-19 list again on November 10, and activated again four days later.

2021
On August 31, 2021, Samuels was waived by the Steelers as part of final roster cuts and re-signed to the practice squad the next day. He was released on October 27.

Houston Texans
On October 29, 2021, Samuels was signed to the Houston Texans practice squad.

Arizona Cardinals
On January 19, 2022, Samuels signed a reserve/future contract with the Arizona Cardinals. He was released on May 31, 2022.

References

External links
Pittsburgh Steelers bio
NC State Wolfpack bio

1996 births
Living people
Players of American football from Charlotte, North Carolina
American football running backs
NC State Wolfpack football players
Pittsburgh Steelers players
Houston Texans players
Arizona Cardinals players